Asheldham Brook is a river that flows entirely through the Maldon district in Essex, United Kingdom. It has its main source near Batts Road in the St Lawrence parish, and its mouth at Grange Outfall on the Dengie marshes, flowing out into the North Sea.

Route
There are at least three actual sources for the brook. The primary source is located near the village of St. Lawrence. From here, the brook flows south-east before meeting another brook (which is a confluence between the two other sources) at a confluence just outside the village of Asheldham. From here, the brook flows just south of the village, and continues east through the Dengie marshes. Eventually, the river meets the Dengie sea wall at Grange Outfall. Here it passes through into the sands off the Dengie coast and out into the North Sea.

Uses
The brook is one of the main drainage systems for the Dengie peninsula. The River Blackwater to the north of the peninsula and the River Crouch to the south of the peninsula also help drain it, with the Asheldham Brook flowing through the middle.
Asheldham Brook is also used for irrigation for the fields in the marshes.

Gallery
In order from furthest upstream to furthest downstream:

See also
Asheldham
Dengie peninsula

References

External links
Brook at geograph.org.uk

Rivers of Essex
Maldon District